Sixty Four is the 21st studio album and 26th album overall from Scottish singer-songwriter Donovan. It is composed of demo tracks recorded by Donovan in 1964.  Sixty Four was released in the United States in February 2004 by Donovan Discs, his own record label.

History
In the summer of 1964, Donovan negotiated his first record contract with Pye Records and recorded several demo songs. At the time, these demos were intended to circulate within the record company and were not intended for public release.  The tapes were subsequently archived and their existence was relatively unknown to the public.

When Donovan was assisting with the compilation of his first compact disc boxed set Troubadour: The Definitive Collection 1964–1976 in the early 1990s, he gained possession of the original demos.  Two of the songs were released on the boxed set; covers of Tim Hardin's "London Town" and Buffy Sainte-Marie's "Co'dine".  The remainder of the tapes remained unreleased.

After the release of Sutras in 1996, Donovan focused on reorganizing his business around his own website and launching his own independent music label, Donovan Discs.  Donovan Discs issued the set of demos as Sixty Four exclusively through Donovan's new website.  A limited number of copies were signed by Donovan and also sold from the website.

The demo tapes feature an 18-year-old Donovan playing guitar and mouth harp.  His style is remarkably close to that of both Woody Guthrie and Bob Dylan, but the songs also feature a distinct style that further developed on Donovan's first two albums, What's Bin Did and What's Bin Hid and Fairytale.

Track listing
All tracks composed by Donovan Leitch; except where indicated
"Crazy 'Bout a Woman" (Jesse Fuller) – 2:42
"Talkin' Pop Star Blues" – 3:29
"Dirty Old Town" (Ewan MacColl) – 2:31
"Keep on Truckin'" (Traditional; arranged by Donovan Leitch) – 2:19
"Co'dine" (Buffy Sainte-Marie) – 4:47
"London Town" (Tim Hardin) – 4:08
"Isle of Sadness" – 3:03
"Darkness of My Night" – 3:28
"Freedom Road" (Emerson Harper, Langston Hughes) – 2:06

References

External links
 Sixty Four – Donovan Unofficial Site

Donovan albums
2004 albums